Ron Beilke is the former city councilman of Pico Rivera, California. He is a registered Democrat.

Beilke was elected to the Pico Rivera City Council in 2005 and served as the mayor from 2007–2009. He was defeated in his attempt for re-election on November 3, 2009 amid scandals of voter fraud and conflict of interest by the District Attorney. He has served as a member on various boards and committees such as the Los Angeles County Sanitation District, Gateway Cities Council of Governments, and the Southeast Water Joint Powers Authority.

References

External links
Official Pico Rivera website profile

Living people
Mayors of places in California
People from Pico Rivera, California
Year of birth missing (living people)
Mayors of Pico Rivera, California